The Attorney General for Northern Ireland is the chief legal adviser to the Northern Ireland Executive for both civil and criminal matters that fall within the devolved powers of the Northern Ireland Assembly. The Attorney General for Northern Ireland is also responsible for appointing the director and deputy director of the Public Prosecution Service for Northern Ireland.

History
The original post was formed in 1921 with the establishment of the Parliament of Northern Ireland and was always held by an Ulster Unionist Party MP. A Deputy Attorney General briefly held office in 1946, when the post was held by Edmond Warnock MP (21 June – 11 September).

The Attorney General for England and Wales performed the role of Attorney General for Northern Ireland after the prorogation of the Parliament of Northern Ireland in 1972. These office-holders were always United Kingdom Government Ministers.

Justice powers were again devolved to the Northern Ireland Assembly on 12 April 2010, at which point the Attorney General for England and Wales ceased to hold office as Attorney General of Northern Ireland.  She instead became Advocate General for Northern Ireland and a vacancy occurred. John Larkin QC became the first politically independent office-holder, taking office on 24 May 2010, when he was appointed by First Minister Peter Robinson and deputy First Minister Martin McGuinness.

The role and powers of the Attorney General for Northern Ireland are provided in the Justice (Northern Ireland) Act 2002. The Attorney General is appointed for a term of not more than five years jointly by the First Minister and deputy First Minister of Northern Ireland. The Attorney General is permitted to participate in the proceedings of the Assembly, but not to vote.

Office-holders

Devolved government 1921–1972
Colour key (for political parties):

Direct rule 1972–2010
Colour key (for political parties):

Devolved government 2010–present

Colour key (for political parties):

See also 
Law Officers of the Crown
Advocate General for Northern Ireland
Attorney General for England and Wales
Department of Justice (Northern Ireland)
Executive Office (Northern Ireland)

References

External links 
 Office of the Attorney General for Northern Ireland

Law of Northern Ireland
 
Region-specific legal occupations
Political office-holders in Northern Ireland
Legal ethics
Law Officers of the Crown in the United Kingdom